Magneux-Courlandon station (French: Gare de Magneux-Courlandon) is a railway station located in the French municipality of Magneux, in the département of Marne.

In 2018, the SNCF estimated that 17,563 passengers travelled through the station.

Services 
The station is served by TER Grand Est trains between Reims and Fismes (line C11) operated by the SNCF.

References 

TER Grand Est
Railway stations in Marne (department)